('Syndicalist Workers Federation', SAF) was an anarcho-syndicalist trade union centre in Sweden 1928–1938. SAF published the weekly newspaper  from Göteborg. SAF criticised SAC of centralism and bureaucracy. SAF consistently tried to keep its membership dues low, in order to attract low-paid workers. P. J. Welinder, who for a short time sat on the board of the IWW during his time as an immigrant to the US, was the ideological force in the union. Folke Fridell, the famous proletarian writer, was also a notable member.

In 1928 SAF had around 1,000 members. By the mid-1930s, the number had grown to around 3,000.

SAC took several initiatives towards a reunification with SAF. In 1938, SAF merged into SAC.

References 

National trade union centers of Sweden
Trade unions established in 1928
Trade unions disestablished in 1938
1928 establishments in Sweden
Anarchist Federations
Anarchist organizations in Sweden
Defunct anarchist organizations in Europe
Syndicalist trade unions